Charlotte Lady Eagles is an American women's soccer team, founded in 2000. Between 2002 and 2015 the Lady Eagles were a member of the United Soccer Leagues USL W-League, the second tier of women's soccer in the United States and Canada, and a member of the W-2 League between 2000 and 2002.

The team plays its home games at the Sportsplex at Matthews in Matthews, North Carolina, alternating between an auxiliary field and the stadium depending on demand. The club's colors are orange, sky blue and white.

The Lady Eagles are a division of Missionary Athletes International (MAI), an organization committed to sharing the message of Christianity through sports ministry. They are a sister organization of the MAI men's USL League Two franchises the Charlotte Eagles and the Southern California Seahorses.

While the W-League folded in 2015, MAI announced plans to continue training women and girls as players and coaches. After three years playing an independent schedule, the Lady Eagles joined the Women's Premier Soccer League for the 2019 season.

Players

Current roster 2019

Notable former players

  Abby Crumpton
  Keeley Dowling
  Kelly Schmedes
  Lydia Vandenbergh
  Annemieke Griffioen 
  Hieke Zijlstra
  Ashleigh Gunning
  Leah Fortune

Head coaches
 Lee Horton (2000–2015)
 Mitch Sanford (2015–2018)
 Sam Hope (2018–present)

Year-by-year

Honors
 Women's Premier Soccer League
 Carolinas Conference Champions 2019
 Carolinas Conference South Division Champions 2019

 USL W-League
 Southeastern Conference Champions 2014
 Central Conference Champions (2) 2002, 2006
 Southeastern Division Champions 2012
 Atlantic Division Champions (3) 2002, 2005, 2006

 USL W-2 League
 League Champions 2001
 Eastern Conference Champions 2001
 Atlantic Conference Champions 2000

 Carolinas Cup
 Champions 2021

External links
 Charlotte Eagles website
 Charlotte Eagles on WPSL Soccer

References

   

Charlotte Eagles
Women's soccer clubs in North Carolina
Sports teams in Charlotte, North Carolina
USL W-League (1995–2015) teams
Association football clubs established in 2000
Soccer clubs in North Carolina
Christian sports organizations
2000 establishments in North Carolina